Robert Dodd was an English professional association footballer who played as a half back. He was born in Blackburn, Lancashire and played five games in the Football League for Burnley in the 1910–11 season.

References

Year of birth unknown
Footballers from Blackburn
English footballers
Association football defenders
Burnley F.C. players
English Football League players
Year of death missing